Ragnhild Tove Hveger (later Andersen, 10 December 1920 – 1 December 2011) was a Danish swimmer, who became famous when she won silver medal in the women's 400 m freestyle at the 1936 Summer Olympics. From 1936 to 1943 she set 44 world records, and at one time she held 19 world records in different distances and disciplines. In 1938 she won three gold medals at the European championships.

Being the daughter of a Nazi, sister of an east front volunteer, married to a German officer, she became very unpopular after the war, and was barred from the Danish team for the 1948 Olympics. She competed at the 1952 Olympics and finished fourth in the 4 × 100 m and fifth in the 400 m freestyle events. Hveger retired in 1954 after ending fifth in the 100 m freestyle at the European Championships.

In 1966 she was inducted to the International Swimming Hall of Fame, and 30 years later declared sportswoman of the century by Danmarks Idræts-Forbund.

Youth (1920-1936)
Ragnhild Hveger was born in Nyborg in 1920. Her father was a train driver and a member of the Danish Nazi party. Privately she dreamed about being a nurse but was encouraged by her parent to practise competition swimming. She started competing at the age of 12 and at the age of 14 in 1935 she won her first Nordic championship in 400 m crawl. Her style was smooth with effective leg strokes.

Her club was Elsinor Svimming club.

Olympic Games in Berlin, 1936
Ragnhild Hveger was one of 18 Danish swimmers at the games. She started in three disciplines. In 100 m crawl she reached the semifinal and in 4 × 100 m she and the Danish team reached the final where they came seventh. In her favorite discipline 400 m crawl she won the first heat in a new olympic record and in the semifinal she beat her closest competitor Rie Mastenbroek from the Netherlands. In the final, however, Mastenbroek won and Ragnhild Hveger came second.

The radio helped making her famous. Her final was only the second event in Danish history to be broadcast live on air (the first being a final by another Danish female swimmer, Inge Sørensen, a few days before).

Achievements

Her greatest achievements occurred at the European championships in London 1938. Here she won gold in 100 m crawl, 400 m crawl and 4 × 100 m crawl, which made the British newspaper The Times dubbed her "The Golden Torpedo".

Ragnhild Hveger set 42 individual world records between 1935 and 1942. At the beginning of World War II she was at the peak of her career. In 1941 she held 19 world records in crawl at the same time.

World War II and Nazism

During most of World War II Denmark was occupied by Germany and the only change of international competition was against swimmers from Germany or German-occupied countries like the Netherlands.

Hveger moved in 1943 to Kiel in Germany, where she for at time worked as a swimming teacher. At the time she was living with a German soldier she had met in Denmark. According to Ragnhild Hveger he died on a ship outside Danzig. Together they had a daughter which she managed to get with her back to Denmark when the Nazi regime broke down in 1945.

After the war

After the war Ragnhild Hveger was interned for six weeks in Sundholm at a forced labor camp, under suspicion of collaboration with the Germans during the war. Her parents and her brother had been active in the Danish Nazi party. Both her father and her brother fought on the Eastern front and were sentenced to jail, however she was not prosecuted. She nevertheless moved to Sweden for a period.

Her association with nazism led to her being banned by the Danish swimming association from going to the Olympic Games in London 1948. Officially, the given reason was that she had violated the amateur rules by working as a swimming teacher. She was restricted until 1950.

At the Olympic Games in Helsinki 1952 she participated and came fifth on 400 m crawl in a time better than her final time from 1936. At that time she was still the recordholder on the distance.

After her swimming career she worked as a coach and swimming teacher in Copenhagen and stayed out of public life.

Legacy

Ragnhild Hvegers performance in swimming have given her a number of awards. In 1968 she was inducted to the International Swimming Hall of Fame at Fort Lauderdale Florida as only one of four Danes. When the Danish Swimming Hall of Fame was created in 2013 she was inducted there too. Likewise she is inducted to the Danish Sport Hall of Fame at its creation in 1992.

Records

See also
Jenny Kammersgaard, Danish long-distance swimmer from the same period
List of members of the International Swimming Hall of Fame

References

External links

 Pat Besford, Encyclopaedia of Swimming (London:  St. Martin's Press, 1971).
 David Wallechinsky and Jaime Loucky, The Complete Book of the Olympics (London:  Aurum, 2008).

1920 births
2011 deaths
Danish female swimmers
Danish female freestyle swimmers
Danish female backstroke swimmers
Swimmers at the 1936 Summer Olympics
Swimmers at the 1952 Summer Olympics
Olympic swimmers of Denmark
Olympic silver medalists for Denmark
World record setters in swimming
European Aquatics Championships medalists in swimming
Medalists at the 1936 Summer Olympics
Olympic silver medalists in swimming
People from Nyborg
Sportspeople from the Region of Southern Denmark